Capo Sant'Elia Lighthouse is an active lighthouse located on Capo Sant'Elia promontory, adjacent to Calamosca Bay which separates the Golfo degli Angeli from that of Quartu Sant'Elena. The structure is situated in the municipality of Quartu Sant'Elena, in the southern Sardinia on the Tyrrhenian Sea.

Description
The tower is painted with black and white horizontal bands. The lantern, which mounts a Type OR D4 optics, is painted in white and the dome in grey metallic. The lighthouse is completely automated and managed by the Marina Militare with the identification code number 1270 E.F.

See also
 List of lighthouses in Italy
 Quartu Sant'Elena

References

External links

 Servizio Fari Marina Militare

Lighthouses in Italy
Lighthouses completed in 1860
1860 establishments in Italy
Buildings and structures in the Metropolitan City of Cagliari